Auernhammer is a German surname. Notable people with the surname include:

 Artur Auernhammer (born 1963), German politician
 Josepha Barbara Auernhammer (1758–1820), Austrian pianist and composer

German toponymic surnames